Chetone decisa is a moth of the family Erebidae. It was described by Francis Walker in 1854. It is found in Colombia.

References

Chetone
Moths described in 1854